In chemistry, acetylation  is an organic esterification reaction with acetic acid. It introduces an acetyl group into a chemical compound. Such compounds are termed acetate esters or simply acetates. Deacetylation is the opposite reaction, the removal of an acetyl group from a chemical compound.

Acetylation/deacetylation in biology 
Deacylations "play crucial roles in gene transcription and most likely in all eukaryotic biological processes that involve chromatin".

Acetylation is one type of post-translational modification of proteins.  The acetylation of the ε-amino group of lysine, which is common, converts a charged side chain to a neutral one.  Acetylation/deacetylation of histones also plays a role in gene expression and cancer.  These modifications are effected by enzymes called histone acetyltransferases (HATs) and histone deacetylases (HDACs). 

Two general mechanisms are known for deacetylation.  One mechanism involves zinc binding to the acetyl oxygen.  Another family of deacetylases require NAD+, which transfers an ribosyl group to the acetyl oxygen.

Organic synthesis 
Acetate esters and acetamides are generally prepared by acetylations.  Acetylations are often used in making C-acetyl bonds in Friedel-Crafts reactions. Carbanions and their equivalents are susceptible to acetylations.

Acetylation reagents 
Many acetylations are achieved using these three reagents:
Acetic anhydride. This reagent is common in the laboratory; its use cogenerates acetic acid.
Acetyl chloride. This reagent is also common in the laboratory, but its use cogenerates hydrogen chloride, which can be undesirable.
Ketene. At one time acetic anhydride was prepared by the reaction of ketene with acetic acid:

Acetylation of cellulose 

Cellulose is a polyol and thus susceptible to acetylation, which is achieved using acetic anhydride.  Acetylation disrupts hydrogen bonding, which otherwise dominates the properties of cellulose.  Consequently, the cellulose esters are soluble in organic solvents and can be cast into fibers and films.

Transacetylation
Transacetylation uses vinyl acetate as an acetyl donor and lipase as a catalyst.  This methodology allows the preparation of enantio-enriched alcohols and acetates.

See also 
Acetoxy group
Acylation
Amide
Ester
Organic synthesis

References 

Organic reactions